Derry's Clock Tower (or Derry's Cross) is a free-standing clock tower in the city of Plymouth, England.

The clock and the nearby former bank are the only buildings to survive the Blitz and postwar development in the immediate area.

On 1 May 1975, English Heritage listed the clock tower at Grade II for its architectural and historical importance.

History 

Built in 1862, it was intended as a personal gift for the Prince of Wales, Albert Edward (the future Edward VII) and Princess Alexandra Caroline Marie Charlotte Louise Julia, the daughter of Christian IX of Denmark. The clock tower was a gift from William Derry (1817–1903), the Mayor of Plymouth between 1861–62.

Prior to the destruction of the area in World War II, the clock stood at a major junction of the city comprising George Street, Union Street and Lockyer Street and was commonly regarded as the centre of Plymouth.

Present day 

Today, the structure stands behind the new Theatre Royal.

The clock in the tower has worked for almost all of its 157-year history, including during the Blitz, but as of 3 September 2019, the clock is not functioning.

References 

Towers completed in 1862
Clock towers in the United Kingdom
Buildings and structures in Plymouth, Devon
Grade II listed buildings in Devon
Grade II listed monuments and memorials
Monuments and memorials in Devon
Derry